Nik Pey (also Romanized as Nīk Pey) is a city in Zanjanrud District of Zanjan County, Zanjan province, Iran. At the 2006 census, its population was 427 in 119 households, when it was a village. The following census in 2011 counted 474 people in 122 households. The latest census in 2016 showed a population of 455 people in 115 households, by which time the village had been elevated to the status of a city.

References 

Zanjan County

Cities in Zanjan Province

Populated places in Zanjan Province

Populated places in Zanjan County